LDM, Ldm or LdM may stand for:

Science and technology
Logical data model, a representation of an organization's data, organized in terms of entities and relationships
Logical Disk Manager
Local Data Manager
LTSP Display Manager, an X display manager for Linux Terminal Server Project
Latitude dependent mantle, a widespread layer of ice-rich material on Mars

Other

Leonora Di Millie, a high end fashion brand
Scuola Lorenzo de' Medici, Italy
 Liberal Democrats (UK), a British political party
Left defensive midfielder, a position in association football
Lucas Dumbrell Motorsport
 Louis/Dressner McKenna, an American importer of wine.